Monthureux-sur-Saône (literally Monthureux on Saône) is a commune in the Vosges department in Grand Est in northeastern France.

Inhabitants are called Monthurolais.

History

Origins and Etymology
The name Monthureux comes from the base Latin word "monasteriolum" meaning 'little monastery'.  By the fourteenth century the name had mutated to  Monstreuil.

The origins of the little town are uncertain.   During the turbulent aftermath of the Gallo-Roman period, the site currently occupied by Monthureux-sur-Saône was probably abandoned to the forest.   The name "Monasteriolum" (little monastery) only dates from the end of the ninth century.   Subsequent spelling included "Monstreuil", "Montreuil", "Montreux" and "Montureux".   The "h" in the spelling of the modern name is believed to result from a clerical error by a transcriber in 1628 who wrote "Montheureux".

The beginnings of Monthureux are frequently thought to involve the Gallo-Roman cemetery and the feudal castle, but the site was actually  settled long before the arrival of the Romans.   The town was settled in the time of the Lingons who had their capital at Langres, and who controlled the territory in this area all the way to the Upper Saône valley (modern Haute-Saône) and the vast Forest of Darney.

Romans and their successors
Once the Romans arrived, they organised the construction of various military roads, one of which passes Monthureux on the way from Langres to Baccarat.

After the Romans came the Franks and the Burgundians and presumably these tribes populated the region.   However, it is probably that during the time Monthureux itself was not populated.

Medieval
The monastery for which the town is named may have dated back to the Carolingian period.   The current church positioned on the site of the old monastery was completely rebuilt in the sixteenth century, but some traces of the eleventh-century arches survive on the exterior of the building on its north side. Of the priory itself, just two massive pillars survive, at the foot of an old stone staircase leading to the old cemetery.

Personalities
 Charles Levy (1805-1872), born at Monthureux-sur-Saône, registered a patent for a nail manufacturing machine that improved the production process.   A street at Bains-les-Bains is named after him.
 Charles Godard (1827-1899), born at Monthureux-sur-Saône, was an architect who worked for the diocese of Langres and a prodigious builder of churches in the area.

See also
Communes of the Vosges department

References

Communes of Vosges (department)